The 2015 African Women's Junior Handball Championship was the 22nd edition of the African Women's Junior Handball Championship. The event, organized by the African Handball Confederation, under the supervision of the International Handball Federation, took place at the Kasarani Indoor Arena in Nairobi, Kenya, from July 11 to 18 2015. Six teams participated on the tournament. Angola, successfully defended its title after tying the last game with Tunisia. While both teams finished with 11 points, Angola had an edge in the goal difference.

The top three teams qualified for the 2016 Women's Junior World Handball Championship, in Russia.

All matches
All teams played in a round robin system.

All times are local (UTC+3).

Day 1

Day 2

Day 3

Day 4

Day 5

Final standings

Awards

See also
 2014 African Women's Handball Championship
 2015 African Women's Youth Handball Championship

References

External links
 Tournament page on the African Handball Confederation official website

2015 in African handball
African Women's Youth Handball Championship
African Junior
Junior
International handball competitions hosted by Kenya
African Women's